Iskhak Shumafovich Mashbash is a Circassian poet, writer and translator. He is the author of more than 80 books in Adyghe and he has translated many works from Russian to Adyghe and Kabardian, including the Quran. His works were published in English, French, Spanish, German, Polish, Mongolian, Turkish, Arabic and other languages.

Despite gaining high positions in Russia and USSR, he was criticized by Russians for writing about the Circassian genocide. All of his works were published in 20 volumes in Adyghe and Russian in 2015. His works have been translated to Turkish by Fahri Huvaj, a prominent Circassian nationalist in Turkey.He has received several awards, some of which are the Hero of Labor of the Russian Federation (2019), People's writer of Adygea (1993), Kabardino-Balkaria, Karachay-Cherkessia, laureate of the USSR State Prize (1991), the State Prize of the RSFSR (1981), the State Prize of the Republic of Adygea.
He is respected by Circassians worldwide. In 2016, a monument of Iskhak Mashbash was built in his homeland, in the village of Urupsky.

Biography 

He was born on 28 May 1930 in the village of Urupsky, now in the Uspensky district of the Krasnodar Krai. In 1957 he graduated with honors from the Maxim Gorky Literature Institute in Moscow. In 1962 he graduated from the Department of Press, Television and Radio Broadcasting of the Higher Party School under the Central Committee of the CPSU. From 1956 to 1959 he worked as the head of the department of the regional newspaper "Socialist Adygea". In collaboration with Umar Tkhabisomov, he created the Anthem of the Republic of Adygea.

Sources 

Socialist realism writers
Recipients of the Order of Friendship of Peoples
Recipients of the Order "For Merit to the Fatherland", 4th class
Recipients of the Order "For Merit to the Fatherland", 3rd class
Recipients of the Order "For Merit to the Fatherland", 2nd class
Recipients of the USSR State Prize
Translators from Russian
20th-century translators
Russian translators
Soviet translators
20th-century Russian poets
Russian poets
Soviet poets
20th-century Russian writers
Soviet writers
Living people
1930 births
Quran translators
Circassian people of Russia
Adyghe language
Kabardian-language writers
Maxim Gorky Literature Institute alumni